In Greek mythology, Capheira (Ancient Greek: Καφείρας or Καφείρα Kapheira) was an Oceanid, as a daughter of the Titan of the Sea, Oceanus, possibly by his sister-wife Tethys. Her name means "stormy-breath" from eir and kaphos.

Mythology 
Capheira was a Rhodian nymph who became the nurse of the infant god Poseidon. Along with the Telchines, Capheira was committed by Rhea to the care and protection of the babe.

Notess

References 

 Diodorus Siculus, The Library of History translated by Charles Henry Oldfather. Twelve volumes. Loeb Classical Library. Cambridge, Massachusetts: Harvard University Press; London: William Heinemann, Ltd. 1989. Vol. 3. Books 4.59–8. Online version at Bill Thayer's Web Site
 Diodorus Siculus, Bibliotheca Historica. Vol 1-2. Immanel Bekker. Ludwig Dindorf. Friedrich Vogel. in aedibus B. G. Teubneri. Leipzig. 1888–1890. Greek text available at the Perseus Digital Library.

Oceanids